Cathryn Bradshaw (born 13 January 1964, Blackpool) is an English actress  known for her role in Oranges Are Not the Only Fruit.

Background
Cathryn Bradshaw was born in Blackpool in 1964 and brought up in Poulton-le-Fylde, Lancashire where she attended Breck School. She trained at the Bristol Old Vic Theatre School in Bristol, alongside Louise Plowright and Mark Strong, and graduated in 1987.

She married actor Mark Strong in Lancashire in 1989, but the marriage ended in divorce after only a few years.

Career
Bradshaw's first television role came in 1988 when she played the Princess in an episode of The Storyteller. The following year she appeared in an episode of Inspector Morse ("The Secret of Bay 5B") and in the 1989 comedy musical film, Bert Rigby, You're a Fool alongside Robert Lindsay and Robbie Coltrane.

Then in 1990, she played Melanie in the acclaimed BBC television drama Oranges Are Not the Only Fruit opposite Charlotte Coleman. She also appeared in four episodes of the ITV crime drama Chancer. She made a number of television appearances throughout the 1990s,. In 1996, Bradshaw appeared at the National Theatre in Helen Edmundson's adaptation of Leo Tolstoy's War and Peace, and from 1997 to 1999 she was a member of the Royal Shakespeare Company She has also appeared in Down to Earth and Midsomer Murders.

In 2003, she played Paula in romantic drama film, The Mother opposite Daniel Craig, and in 2004 she played Mary Webb in the BBC musical drama Blackpool. She appeared in two films in 2006. Firstly, the romantic comedy Venus, as Jillian. She appeared in the psychological thriller Like Minds as Helen Colbie. She played Margaret Littlefair in the satirical black comedy television series Suburban Shootout which aired on Five and Paramount Comedy in the United Kingdom. In 2007, she appeared in an episode of the BBC sitcom Lead Balloon.

Filmography

Film

Television

References

External links

Living people
English film actresses
English television actresses
People from Blackpool
Actresses from Lancashire
Alumni of Bristol Old Vic Theatre School
21st-century English actresses
20th-century English actresses
1964 births